Judo was first included in the Summer Olympic Games at the 1964 Games in Tokyo, Japan.  After not being included in 1968, judo has been an Olympic sport in each Olympiad since then. Only male judoka participated until the 1988 Summer Olympics, when women participated as a demonstration sport. Women judoka were first awarded medals at the 1992 Summer Olympics.

Summary

Note: Women's judo made its first appearance at the 1988 Olympic Games, as a demonstration sport. Women's Judo became an official part of the Olympic games from the 1992 Barcelona games and has been an integral part of the games since.

Competition format
Judoka compete in weight classes. Each country may qualify a maximum of one athlete per weight class. Gold and silver medals are awarded based on a single elimination bracket.  Two bronze medals are awarded in each weight class; quarter-finalists losers fight against each other in the same half of bracket. Losers finish in seventh place, winners advance to the bronze medal contest against losing semifinalist of the opposite half of the bracket. Winners of these contests receive bronze medal and losers finish in fifth place.

Weight classes
There have been between 4 and 8 Olympic weight classes over the years (currently 7), and the definition of each class has changed several times, as shown in the following table.

Men

Women

Mixed Team Event 
The mixed team event first made an appearance at the 2020 Olympic Games. The event includes teams of six athletes from different weight categories, including three men (-73 kg, -90 kg and +90 kg) and three women (-57 kg, -70 kg and +70 kg). Nation competes against nation, with rounds composed of six individual bouts. The winner of each bout will be awarded one point and the minimum score a team will need to progress to the next round will be 4:2.

Medal table
Judoka from 56 nations have won medals, representing all 5 continents.

Updated until 2020 Summer Olympics

Number of judoka by nation

See also
 List of Olympic venues in judo
 Judo at the Summer Paralympics

References

 
Olympic Games
Olympic Games
Judo